London 03.06.17 (alternatively titled London 03.06.17 [field day]) is an extended play by English electronic musician Richard D. James, released under the pseudonym AFX on 3 June 2017 on Warp. The EP was made available for sale in unknown limited numbers at the Field Day festival on the same day that Richard D. James performed there. The record sold out soon after its announcement. The EP was released with extra tracks on James' Bleep Store on 20 July 2017.

Track listing

References

2017 EPs
Aphex Twin EPs
Warp (record label) EPs